Bulletproof Wallets is the third studio album by Wu-Tang Clan member Ghostface Killah. The album was released on November 13, 2001, by Epic Records and SME Records. The album featured the single, "Never Be the Same Again", featuring Carl Thomas and Raekwon. And single, “Ghost Showers”, featuring Madame Majestic.

Critical reception

Bulletproof Wallets received generally positive reviews from music critics. John Bush of AllMusic said, "Bulletproof Wallets is basically a party album, at least compared to the usual Wu-Tang gloom and doom, featuring smooth, romantic R&B tracks like the single "Never Be the Same Again" (with Carl Thomas & Raekwon) and "Love Session." Pat Blashill of Rolling Stone said, "Bulletproof Wallets is riveting because even on "The Juks," when he's rhyming about getting paid, he comes off like a tough but fatally vulnerable anti-hero, forever trapped in the headlights of oncoming disaster."

Mark Desrosiers of PopMatters said, "Bulletproof Wallets doesn't have the peering-into-the-abyss street insanity of Ironman, sure, but it does come close. And damn, it sure does air you out nonetheless." James Poletti of Yahoo! Music said, "Whilst Ghostface remains in possession of one of the most diverse musical imaginations in the Clan, this is ultimately disappointing in its lack of innovation."

Track listing 

Sample credits
"Intro" contains a sample from "Stairway To Heaven" by The O'Jays.
"Maxine" contains a sample from "Harlem Clavinette" by J.J. Johnson.
"Flowers" contains a sample from "Take Me To The Mardi Gras" by Bob James.
"Teddy (Skit)" contains a sample from "Hope That We Can Be Together Soon" by Harold Melvin & The Blue Notes.
"Theodore" contains a sample from "40,000 Headmen" by Blood, Sweat & Tears.
"Ghost Showers" contains a sample from "Sunshower" by Dr. Buzzard's Original Savannah Band.
"Strawberry" contains a sample from "Storm In The Summertime" by David Porter.
"The Forest" contains a sample from "The Wonderful World of Disney" by The Wonderful World of Disney.
"Walking Through The Darkness" contains a sample from "Across 110th Street" by Bobby Womack.
"The Juks" contains a sample from "Dos Amores Desiguales" by Chucho Avellanet.
"Jealousy (Skit)" contains a sample from "Jealousy" by Ann Peebles.
"The Hilton" contains a sample from "Maria" by Michael Jackson.
"Ice (Interlude)" contains a sample from "She Is My Lady" by Donny Hathaway.

Charts

Weekly charts

Year-end charts

References

Ghostface Killah albums
2001 albums
Epic Records albums
Albums produced by RZA
Albums produced by the Alchemist (musician)